Sanamahism (Meitei religion) is a polytheistic religion with thousands of deities, gods and goddesses of varying power, quality, features, and character.

The religion originated in the Kingdom of Manipur, and is still practiced in modern Manipur, India, distinct from both the Indosphere and the Sinosphere.

The following is a list of deities, gods, goddesses, demigods, mortals, immortals and a few mythical creatures. This does not include the full list of mythical creatures of ancient Meitei folklore, for which see List of creatures in Meitei folklore.

Main deities 

There are five main deities in the ancient Meitei religion and Meitei mythology, namely:

Asheeba - He's the Guardian God and the protector of mankind. He is also known as Sanamahi.
Apanba - He's the Supreme ruler of the universe and the destroyer of evil. He's also known as Pakhangba.
Atingkok - He's the Creator of the Universe. He's also known as Atiya Sidaba.
Leimarel Sidabi - Supreme Goddess, mother earth.
Imoinu Ahongbi - Goddess of Wealth, she is also an Incarnation of Goddess Leimarel Sidabi
Among them, Lainingthou Sanamahi, Leimarel Sidabi and Imoinu Ahongbi are the household deities worshipped.

Atingkok 

The creator of Universe in Sanamahism is believed to be Lord Atingkok Maru Sidaba, father of Lainingthou Sanamahi and  Pakhangba.

Lainingthou 

The term "Lainingthou" literally means King of Gods or the Divine King and it is applied to various deities such as Lainingthou  Khoriphaba, Lainingthou Soraren, etc. However, it is generally used to refer Lainingthou Sanamahi.

Pakhangba 

There are several serpent deities in the pantheon. However, the supreme most one is Lord Pakhangba.

Shayon (incarnations) 

Leimarel Sidabi, the supreme goddess has incarnated several times in various divine forms with diverse attributes.

Related deities

Celestial maidens 

In Meitei mythology, there are seven prominent celestial maidens, which are referred to as either goddesses or nymphs.

Lai Nuraa Taret

The seven celestial maidens are considered as seven goddesses or "Lai Nuraa Taret ", the creation of the Lord Atingkok Maru Sidaba.

Helloi Taret

The seven celestial maidens are considered as seven nymphs or "Helloi Taret ", who are the daughters of the Sky God Soraren. They are then believed to be spinsters.

Apokpa (ancestral deities) 

In ancient Meitei religion, the ancestral deities of every families and clans were called Apokpa. They are worshipped by their respective families (Yumnak) and clans (Yek Salai).

According to T.C. Hodson's book The Meitheis, the Meitei people are the only people who have a tradition of worshipping their ancestral deities in Manipur.

Dragons in Meitei mythology

The following is a list of a few dragons of Meitei mythology:

Planet deities 

According to a PuYa "Khenchonglol" (literally meaning, study of  Heavenly bodies, Planets, Celestial bodies  in the Ningthou Turel or Milky Way Galaxy of the  Universe), there are nine Planets which are considered as deities. Even the Sun and the Moon are considered as planets in Meitei Philosophy. They are as follows:

Star deities  

According to Khenchonglol, there are twenty seven stars which are referred to as deities, out of which the constellation Orion is the most significant. They are as follows:

 Sajik (Arietis) 
 Thaba (Musca) 
 Khongjom Nubi (Pleiades) 
 Apaknga (Lunar, pauri, masion) 
 Sachung Telheiba (A Orionis) 
 Likla Saphaba (Orion) 
 Chingcharoibi (G Geminorum) 
 Chungshennubi (Cancer)

Umang Lai 

There are more than 365 forest deities or "Umang Lai" in Sanamahism. They are always associated with a Sacred grove each in Kanglei World. The term Umang Lai is also used to refer to the sacred abodes of the deities. Some of the significant ones are:

 Nongshaba - The highest deity associated with Sacred grove  or "Umang Lai" in Sanamahism.
 Konthoujam Lairembi gi Khubam
 Ebudhou Khamlangba
 Ima Khunthok Hanbi
 Hiyangthang Lairembi
 Ima Langol Lairembi
 Langol Ningthou
 Thanga Ching Ningthou
 Ipathakok
 Ikop Ningthou
 Laininthou Naothingkhong Pakhangba
 Ima Tamphaton Petangaa

Directional gods 

In Meitei religion and mythology, there are ten directions in Meitei philosophy, for which there are ten deities who are the protectors and the guardians of the respective directions.

Local deities

River goddesses 
There are various river goddesses worshipped by the followers of Sanamahism. The main rivers associated with these goddesses originated from Manipur.

Some of them are as follows:

 Thongjarok Lairembi of Thongjaorok River
 Iril Lairembi of Iril River
 Imphal Turel Lairembi of Imphal River
 Kongba Turel Lairembi of Kongba River

Lake goddesses 
There are various Lake Goddesses worshipped by the followers of Sanamahism, considering the spirits as the guardian and protector of the periphery region of the lake. Some of the deities are:

 Loktak Lairembi of Loktak Lake
 Pumlenpat Lairembi of Pumlenpat Lake

Market goddesses 
People worshipped one goddess for each market area considering the spirit of the goddess as the protector, guardian of the region. Some of the goddesses are as follows:

 Pishum Keithel Lairembi of Pishumthong Market Region
 Singjamei Keithel Lairembi of Singjamei Market Region.
 Kongba Keithel Lairembi of Kongba Market Region

Lists in alphabetical order
Here's a lists of the deities in alphabetical order:

A
 Apanba
 Ashiba
  Apanthoibi
 Atiya Kuru Sidaba

C
 Changning Leima
 Cheikhetpi
 Chothe Thangwai Pakhangba

E
 Emoinu
 Engarel Sidaba
 Ereima

F
 Fauoibi

H
 Hikubi Yaikubi
 Hi Leima
 Hiyangthang Lairembi

I
 Imoinu Ahongbi
 Irai Leima
 Ireima

K
 Khamlangba
 Khoriphaba
 Khunthokhanbi
 Konthoujam Lairembi

L
 Lainingthou Sanamahi
 Leimarel Sidabi

M
 Malem Leima
 Mongba Hanba

N
 Ngareima
 Nongda Nongkhal Lembi
 Nongpok Ningthou
 Nongshaba
 Nongthang Leima

O
 Oknarel
 Oksharel Sidaba

P
 Pakhangba
 Phouoibi
 Puthiba

S
 Samurou Lakpa
 Shamadon Ayangba
 Silleima
 Soraren

T
 Tampha Lairembi

U
 Uningthou

W
 Wangbren

Y
 Yaikubi
 Yoibu Noinu Thumleima

See also 
Art and culture of Manipur
 Meitei deities
Art forms of Manipur
List of creatures in Meitei folklore
PuYa
Sanamahi creation myth

References

Bibliography 
 The Meitheis, by T.C. Hodson, Akansha Publication, Kolkata, 1908

External links
 Names of God

Lists of deities
Sanamahism
Names of God in Sanamahism